A list of animated feature films that were released in 2014.

Highest-grossing animated films of 2014
The top ten animated films by worldwide gross in 2014 (as of June 2, 2015) are as follows:

Big Hero 6 has grossed over $650 million, making it the 27th highest grossing animated film of all time. It is the first year since 1997's Hercules finished 11th that an animated film is not in the top 10.

See also
List of animated television series of 2014

References

2014
2014-related lists